The Conservative Party, officially the Conservative and Unionist Party and also known colloquially as the Tories, is one of the two main political parties in the United Kingdom, along with the Labour Party. It is the current governing party, having won the 2019 general election. It has been the primary governing party in the United Kingdom since 2010. The party is on the centre-right of the political spectrum, and encompasses various ideological factions including one-nation conservatives, Thatcherites, and traditionalist conservatives. The party currently has 355 Members of Parliament, 260 members of the House of Lords, 9 members of the London Assembly, 31 members of the Scottish Parliament, 16 members of the Welsh Parliament, 4 directly elected mayors, 30 police and crime commissioners, and around 6,619 local councillors. It holds the annual Conservative Party Conference.

The Conservative Party was founded in 1834 from the Tory Party and was one of two dominant political parties in the 19th century, along with the Liberal Party. Under Benjamin Disraeli, it played a preeminent role in politics at the height of the British Empire. In 1912, the Liberal Unionist Party merged with the party to form the Conservative and Unionist Party. Since the 1920s, the Labour Party emerged to be the Conservatives' main rival and the Conservative–Labour political rivalry has shaped modern British politics for the last century.

In 2010, the Conservatives entered a coalition government with the Liberal Democrats. Following the 2015 general election, the Conservatives formed a government with a small majority. A snap general election in 2017 resulted in the Conservatives losing their majority and governing through a confidence and supply arrangement with the Democratic Unionist Party. In the 2019 general election, the Conservatives won an 80-seat majority, but a series of scandals led to a motion of no confidence in Boris Johnson, the July 2022 government crisis and the prime minister announcing his resignation pending a leadership contest. Johnson was succeeded by Liz Truss, who announced her own resignation less than two months later following another government crisis. Rishi Sunak was elected unopposed as leader of the party on 24 October 2022.

The party has generally adopted liberal economic policies favouring free markets, including deregulation, privatisation, and marketisation, since the 1980s, although historically it advocated for protectionism. The party is British unionist, opposing a united Ireland as well as Scottish and Welsh independence, and has been critical of devolution. Historically, the party supported the continuance and maintenance of the British Empire. The party has taken various approaches towards the European Union (EU), with eurosceptic and, to an increasingly lesser extent, pro-European factions within it. It embraced a strongly eurosceptic position, with the slogan "Get Brexit Done", following the decision to leave the EU in a 2016 referendum held under the Conservative Cameron government. It historically took a socially conservative approach, but its social policy has become more liberal, evidenced by the legalisation of same-sex marriage under the Conservative–Liberal Democrat coalition in 2014, the lifting of the ban on women in combat roles in the military in 2016 under the Cameron government and the legalisation of medical cannabis in 2018 under the second May ministry. In defence policy, it favours a strong military capability including an independent nuclear weapons programme and commitment to NATO membership.

For much of modern British political history, the United Kingdom exhibited a wide urban–rural political divide; the Conservative Party's voting and financial support base has historically consisted primarily of homeowners, business owners, farmers,  real estate developers and middle class voters, especially in rural and suburban areas of England. However, since the EU referendum in 2016, the Conservatives have also targeted working class voters in small and medium-sized urban areas (which were traditionally Labour supporting) by utilising targeted political campaigns against the perceived harms caused by the freedom of movement for workers in the European Union (within the European Single Market) and the European Convention on Human Rights. The Conservatives' domination of British politics throughout the 20th century—having governed for 65 nonconsecutive years—and its re-emergence in the 2010s has led to it being referred to as one of the most successful political parties in the Western world. 

The London, Scottish, Welsh and Northern Irish branches of the party are semi-autonomous. The Conservatives are a founding member party of the International Democrat Union, and were a founding member of the European Conservatives and Reformists Party.

History

Origins 
The Conservative Party was created in the 1830s by Robert Peel. However, some writers trace its origins to the Tory Party which it soon replaced, the name of which had originated as an insult in the reign of Charles II in the 1670s Exclusion Crisis. Other historians point to a faction, rooted in the 18th century Whig Party, that coalesced around William Pitt the Younger in the 1780s. They were known as "Independent Whigs", "Friends of Mr Pitt", or "Pittites" and never used terms such as "Tory" or "Conservative". Pitt died in 1806. From about 1812 on the name "Tory" was commonly used for a new party that, according to historian Robert Blake, "are the ancestors of Conservatism".  Blake adds that Pitt's successors after 1812 "were not in any sense standard-bearers of 'true Toryism'".

The term "Conservative" was suggested as a title for the party by a magazine article by J. Wilson Croker in the Quarterly Review in 1830. The name immediately caught on and was formally adopted under the aegis of Robert Peel around 1834. Peel is acknowledged as the founder of the Conservative Party, which he created with the announcement of the Tamworth Manifesto.  The term "Conservative Party" rather than Tory was the dominant usage by 1845.

Conservatives and Unionists (1867–1914) 

The widening of the electoral franchise in the 19th century forced the Conservative Party to popularise its approach under Edward Smith-Stanley, 14th Earl of Derby and Benjamin Disraeli, who carried through their own expansion of the franchise with the Reform Act of 1867. The party was initially opposed to further expansion of the electorate which Liberal Prime Minister William Gladstone had wanted but eventually acquiesced and allowed passage of Gladstone's 1884 Reform Act. In 1886, the party formed an alliance with Spencer Compton Cavendish, Lord Hartington (later the 8th Duke of Devonshire) and Joseph Chamberlain's new Liberal Unionist Party and, under the statesmen Robert Gascoyne-Cecil, Lord Salisbury and Arthur Balfour, held power for all but three of the following twenty years before suffering a heavy defeat in 1906 when it split over the issue of free trade.  Historian Richard Shannon argues that while Salisbury presided over one of the longest periods of Tory dominance, he misinterpreted and mishandled his election successes. Salisbury's blindness to the middle class and reliance on the aristocracy prevented the Conservatives from becoming a majority party. Historian E. H. H. Green argues that after Salisbury's retirement the Party was ideologically driven and resembled a broader European conservatism. After its defeat in 1906, a radical conservatism emerged that sought to promote "tariff reform" (that is high new tariffs) to unite the British Empire and protect British agriculture and industry from foreign competition and head off the threat of socialism.

Young Winston Churchill denounced Chamberlain's attack on free trade, and helped organise the opposition inside the Unionist/Conservative Party. Nevertheless, Balfour, as party leader, followed Chamberlain's policy introduced protectionist legislation. The high tariff element called itself "Tariff Reformers" and in a major speech in Manchester on 13 May 1904, Churchill warned their takeover of the Unionist/Conservative party would permanently brand it as follows:
A party of great vested interests, banded together in a formidable confederation; corruption at home, aggression to cover it up abroad; the trickery of tariff juggles, the tyranny of a party machine; sentiment by the bucketful; patriotism by the imperial pint; the open hand at the public exchequer, the open door at the public-house; dear food for the million, cheap labour for the millionaire.

Two weeks later, Churchill crossed the floor and formally joined the Liberal Party (he rejoined the Conservatives in 1925). In December, Balfour lost control of his party, as the defections multiplied. He was replaced by Liberal Prime Minister Henry Campbell-Bannerman who called an election in January 1906, which produced a massive Liberal victory with a gain of 214 seats.  Liberal Prime Minister H. H. Asquith enacted a great deal of reform legislation, but the Unionists worked hard at grassroots organizing. Two general elections were held in 1910, one in January and one in December. The two main parties were now almost dead equal in seats. The Unionists had more popular votes but the Liberals kept control with a coalition with the Irish Parliamentary Party.

In 1912, the Liberal Unionists merged with the Conservative Party. In Ireland, the Irish Unionist Alliance had been formed in 1891 which merged Unionists who were opposed to Irish Home Rule into one political movement. Its MPs took the Conservative whip at Westminster, and in essence, formed the Irish wing of the party until 1922. In Britain, the Conservative party was known as the Unionist Party because of its opposition to home rule in Ireland.

Under Bonar Law's leadership in 1911–14, the Party morale improved, the "radical right" wing was contained, and the party machinery strengthened. It made some progress toward developing constructive social policies. Historian Jeremy Smith says Bonar Law was pushing hard—certainly blustering and threatening, and perhaps bluffing—but in the end his strategy proved both coherent and effective.

First World War 

While the Liberals were mostly against the war until the invasion of Belgium, Conservative leaders were strongly in favour of aiding France and stopping Germany. The Liberal party was in full control of the government until its mismanagement of the war effort under the Shell Crisis badly hurt its reputation. An all-party coalition government was formed in May 1915. In late 1916 Liberal David Lloyd George became prime minister but the Liberals soon split and the Conservatives dominated the government, especially after their landslide in the 1918 election.  The Liberal party never recovered, but Labour gained strength after 1920.

Nigel Keohane finds that the Conservatives were bitterly divided before 1914, especially on the issue of Irish Unionism and the experience of three consecutive election losses. However the war pulled the party together, allowing it to emphasise patriotism as it found new leadership and worked out its positions on the Irish question, socialism, electoral reform, and the issue of intervention in the economy. The fresh emphasis on anti-Socialism was its response to the growing strength of the Labour Party. When electoral reform was an issue, it worked to protect their base in rural England. It aggressively sought female voters in the 1920s, often relying on patriotic themes.

1920–1945 

In 1922, Bonar Law and Stanley Baldwin led the breakup of the coalition, and the Conservatives governed until 1923, when a minority Labour government led by Ramsay MacDonald came to power. The Conservatives regained power in 1924 and remained in power for the full five-year term. They were defeated in 1929 as a minority Labour government, again led by MacDonald, took office. In 1931, following the collapse of the Labour minority government, it entered another coalition, which was dominated by the Conservatives with some support from factions of both the Liberal Party and the Labour Party (National Labour and National Liberals). In May 1940, a more balanced coalition was formed, the National Government, which, under the leadership of Winston Churchill, saw the United Kingdom through World War II. However, the party lost the 1945 general election in a landslide to the resurgent Labour Party, which won their first-ever majority government.

The concept of the "property-owning democracy" was coined by Noel Skelton in 1923 and became a core principle of the party.

1945–1963

Popular dissatisfaction 
While serving in Opposition during the late 1940s, the Conservative Party exploited and incited growing public anger at food rationing, scarcity, controls, austerity, and omnipresent government bureaucracy. It used the dissatisfaction with the socialist and egalitarian policies of the Labour Party to rally middle-class supporters and build a political comeback that won them the 1951 general election. Their appeal was especially effective to housewives, who faced more difficult shopping conditions after the war than during the war.

Modernising the party 

In 1947, the party published its Industrial Charter which marked its acceptance of the "post-war consensus" on the mixed economy and labour rights. David Maxwell Fyfe chaired a committee into Conservative Party organisation that resulted in the Maxwell Fyfe Report (1948–49). The report required the party to do more fundraising, by forbidding constituency associations from demanding large donations from candidates, with the intention of broadening the diversity of MPs. In practice, it may have had the effect of lending more power to constituency parties and making candidates more uniform.

The success of the Conservative Party in reorganising itself was validated by its victory at the 1951 general election. Winston Churchill, the party leader, brought in a Party chairman to modernise the creaking institution. Frederick Marquis, 1st Earl of Woolton, was a successful department store owner and wartime Minister of Food. As Party chairman 1946–55, he rebuilt the local organisations with an emphasis on membership, money, and a unified national propaganda appeal on critical issues. To broaden the base of potential candidates, the national party provided financial aid to candidates and assisted the local organisations in raising local money. Woolton emphasised rhetoric that characterised the opponents as "Socialist" rather than "Labour". The libertarian influence of Professor Friedrich Hayek's 1944 best-seller Road to Serfdom was apparent in the younger generation, but that took another quarter-century to have a policy impact. By 1951, Labour had worn out its welcome in the middle classes; its factions were bitterly embroiled. The Conservatives felt ready to govern again.

With a narrow victory at the 1951 general election, despite losing the popular vote, Churchill was back in power. Although he was ageing rapidly, he had national and global prestige. Apart from rationing, which was ended in 1954, most of the welfare state enacted by Labour were accepted by the Conservatives and became part of the "post-war consensus" that was satirised as Butskellism and that lasted until the 1970s. The Conservatives were conciliatory towards unions, but they did privatise the steel and road haulage industries in 1953. During the Conservatives' thirteen-year tenure in office, pensions went up by 49% in real terms, sickness and unemployment benefits by 76% in real terms, and supplementary benefits by 46% in real terms. However, family allowances fell by 15% in real terms during that period.

"Thirteen Wasted Years" was a popular slogan attacking the Conservative record 1951–1964. Criticism came primarily from Labour. In addition, there were attacks by the right wing of the Conservative Party itself for its tolerance of socialist policies and reluctance to curb the legal powers of labour unions, thus making them complicit in the Post-war consensus. The critics contend that Britain was overtaken by its economic competitors, and was unable to prevent a troublesome wage-price upward spiral. Historian Graham Goodlad calls for taking a longer perspective. He argues that there were significant advances in transport, healthcare, and higher education.  It would have been unrealistic to expect that Britain could continue as a world power after the huge expense of the Second World War, and the independence of India and other colonies. Goodlad says the Conservative foreign-policy leadership properly adjusted Britain's world role by building an independent nuclear capacity and maintaining a leading role in world affairs, and anyway successive governments seldom did a better job.

The Conservatives were re-elected in 1955 and 1959 with larger majorities. Conservative Prime Ministers Churchill, Anthony Eden, Harold Macmillan and Alec Douglas-Home promoted relatively liberal trade regulations and less state involvement throughout the 1950s and early-1960s. The Suez Crisis of 1956 was a humiliating defeat for Prime Minister Eden, but his successor, Macmillan, minimised the damage and focused attention on domestic issues and prosperity. Macmillan boasted during the 1959 general election that Britain had "never had it so good".

In 1958, Geoffrey Howe co-authored the report A Giant's Strength published by the Inns of Court Conservative Association. The report argued that the unions had become too powerful and that their legal privileges ought to be curtailed. Iain Macleod discouraged the authors from publicising the report. Macmillan believed that trade union votes had contributed towards the 1951 and 1955 victories and thought that it "would be inexpedient to adopt any policy involving legislation which would alienate this support".

Macmillan's bid to join the European Economic Community (EEC) in early 1963 was blocked by French President Charles de Gaulle. The period saw the decline of the United Kingdom as a prominent world leader, with the loss of practically the entire Empire and a laggard economy.

Following controversy over the selections of Harold Macmillan and Alec Douglas-Home via a process of consultation known as the 'Magic Circle', a formal election process was created and the first leadership election was held in 1965. Of the three candidates, Edward Heath won with 150 votes to Reginald Maudling's 133 and Enoch Powell's 15 votes.

Edward Heath (1965–1975) 

Edward Heath's 1970–74 government was known for taking the UK into the EEC, although the right-wing of the party objected to his failure to control the trade unions at a time when a declining British industry saw many strikes, as well as a recession which started in 1973 and lasted for two years.

Since accession to the EEC, which developed into the EU, British membership has been a source of heated debate within the Conservative Party.

Heath had come to power in June 1970 and the last possible date for the next general election was not until mid-1975. However a general election was held in February 1974 in a bid to win public support during a national emergency caused by the miners' strike. However, Heath's attempt to win a second term in power at this "snap" election failed, as a deadlock result left no party with an overall majority. The Conservatives had more votes than Labour, but Labour had four more seats. Heath resigned within days, after failing to gain Liberal Party support to form a coalition government, paving the way for Harold Wilson and Labour to return to power as a minority government. Heath's hopes of returning to power later in the year were ended when Labour won the October 1974 election with an overall majority of three seats.

Margaret Thatcher (1975–1990)

Loss of power weakened Heath's control over the party and Margaret Thatcher deposed him in the 1975 leadership election. The UK in the 1970s had seen sustained high inflation rates, which were above 20% at the time of the leadership election, subsequently falling to below 10%; unemployment had risen, and over the winter of 1978–79 there was a series of strikes known as the "Winter of Discontent". Thatcher led her party to victory at the 1979 general election with a manifesto which concentrated on the party's philosophy rather than presenting a "shopping list" of policies.

As Prime Minister, Thatcher focused on rejecting the mild liberalism of the post-war consensus that tolerated or encouraged nationalisation, strong labour unions, heavy regulation, high taxes, and a generous welfare state. She did not challenge the National Health Service, and supported the Cold War policies of the consensus, but otherwise tried to dismantle and delegitimise it. To replace the old post-war consensus, she built a right-wing political ideology that became known as Thatcherism, based on social and economic ideas from British and American intellectuals such as Friedrich Hayek and Milton Friedman. Thatcher believed that too much socially democratic-oriented government policy was leading to a long-term decline in the British economy. As a result, her government pursued a programme of economic liberalism, adopting a free-market approach to public services based on the sale of publicly owned industries and utilities, as well as a reduction in trade union power. She held the belief that the existing trend of unions was bringing economic progress to a standstill by enforcing "wildcat" strikes, keeping wages artificially high and forcing unprofitable industries to stay open.

One of Thatcher's largest and most successful policies assisted council house tenants in public housing to purchase their homes at favourable rates. The "Right to Buy" had emerged in the late-1940s but was too great a challenge to the Post-War Consensus to win Conservative endorsement. Thatcher from her earliest days in politics favoured the idea because it would lead to a "property-owning democracy", an important idea that had emerged in the 1920s. Some local Conservative-run councils enacted profitable local sales schemes during the late-1960s. By the 1970s, many working-class people had ample incomes to afford to buy homes, and eagerly adopted Thatcher's invitation to purchase their homes at a sizable discount. The new owners were more likely to vote Conservative, as Thatcher had hoped.

Thatcher led the Conservatives to two further electoral victories with landslide majorities in 1983 and 1987. She was greatly admired by her supporters for her leadership in the Falklands War of 1982—which coincided with a dramatic boost in her popularity—and for policies such as giving the right to council house tenants to buy their council house at a discount on market value. She was also deeply unpopular in certain sections of society due to high unemployment, which reached its highest level since the 1930s, peaking at over 3,000,000 people following her economic reforms, and her response to the miners' strike. Unemployment had doubled between 1979 and 1982, largely due to Thatcher's monetarist battle against inflation. At the time of the 1979 general election, inflation had been at 9% or under for the previous year, having decreased under Callaghan, then increased to over 20% in the first two years of the Thatcher ministry, but it had fallen again to 5.8% by the start of 1983 (it continued to be under 7% until 1990). The British economy benefitted in the first Thatcher ministry by tax income from North Sea oil coming on stream.

The period of unpopularity of the Conservatives in the early 1980s coincided with a crisis in the Labour Party, which then formed the main opposition. The Social Democratic Party (SDP) was established in 1981 and consisted of more than twenty breakaway Labour MPs, who quickly formed the SDP-Liberal Alliance with the Liberal Party. By the turn of 1982, the SDP-Liberal Alliance was ahead of the Conservatives in the opinion polls, but victory in the Falklands War in June that year, along with the recovering British economy, saw the Conservatives returning quickly to the top of the opinion polls and winning the 1983 general election with a landslide majority, due to a split opposition vote.

Thatcher now faced, arguably, her most serious rival yet after the 1983 general election, when Michael Foot resigned as Leader of the Labour Party and was succeeded by Neil Kinnock. With a new leader at the helm, Labour were clearly determined to defeat the Conservatives at the next election, and for virtually the entirety of Thatcher's second ministry, it was looking a very serious possibility, as the lead in the opinion polls constantly saw a change in leadership from the Conservatives to Labour, with the Alliance occasionally scraping into first place.

By the time of the general election in June 1987, the economy was stronger, with lower inflation and falling unemployment and Thatcher secured her third successive electoral victory with a second, albeit reduced, landslide majority.

The introduction of the Community Charge (known by its opponents as the poll tax) in 1989 is often cited as contributing to her political downfall. The summer of 1989 saw her fall behind Neil Kinnock's Labour in the opinion polls for the first time since 1986, and her party's fall in popularity continued into 1990. By the second half of that year, opinion polls were showing that Labour had a lead of up to 16 points over the Conservatives, and they faced a tough 18 months ahead of them if they were to prevent Kinnock's ambition to become Prime Minister from becoming a reality. At the same time, the economy was sliding into another recession.

Internal party tensions led to a leadership challenge by the Conservative MP Michael Heseltine; and, after months of speculation about her future as Prime Minister, she resigned on 28 November 1990, making way for a new Conservative leader more likely to win the next general election in the interests of party unity.

John Major (1990–1997)

John Major won the party leadership election on 27 November 1990, and his appointment led to an almost immediate boost in Conservative Party fortunes. A MORI poll six days before Mrs Thatcher's resignation had shown the Conservatives to be 11 points behind Labour, but within two months the Conservatives had returned to the top of the opinion polls with a narrow lead.

A general election had to be held within the next eighteen months and the UK economy was sliding into recession, but 1991 was a year of electoral uncertainty as the Conservatives and Labour regularly swapped places at the top of the opinion polls, and Major resisted Neil Kinnock's numerous calls for an immediate election.

The election was finally held on 9 April 1992 and the Conservatives won a fourth successive electoral victory, even though the economy was still in recession and most of the polls had predicted either a narrow Labour victory or a hung parliament. Major's vigorous campaigning, notably his claim that the UK would have higher prices and higher taxes under a Labour government, was seen to have been crucial to his election win (in which he became the first—and as of 2015, only—Prime Minister to attract 14,000,000 votes in a general election), as was a high-profile campaign by the newspaper The Sun against Labour leader Neil Kinnock, who resigned in the aftermath of the election to be succeeded by John Smith. The Conservative Party also touched upon the issue of immigration, claiming that under Labour, immigration would rise hugely.

The UK economy was deep in recession by this stage and remained so until the end of the year. The pound sterling was forced out of the European Exchange Rate Mechanism on 16 September 1992, a day thereafter referred to as Black Wednesday.

Soon after, approximately one million householders faced repossession of their homes during a recession that saw a sharp rise in unemployment, taking it close to 3,000,000 people. The party subsequently lost much of its reputation for good financial stewardship although the end of the recession was declared in April 1993 bringing economic recovery and a fall in unemployment.

From 1994 to 1997, Major privatised British Rail, splitting it up into franchises to be run by the private sector. Its success is hotly debated, with a large increase in passenger numbers and investment in the network balanced by worries about the level of subsidy. Train fares cost more than under British Rail.

The party was plagued by internal division and infighting, mainly over the UK's role in the European Union. The party's Eurosceptic wing, represented by MPs such as John Redwood, opposed further EU integration, whilst the party's pro-European wing, represented by those such as Chancellor of the Exchequer Kenneth Clarke, was broadly supportive. The issue of the creation of a single European currency also inflamed tensions, and these would continue to dog the party until the early-2000s (decade)".

Major also had to survive a leadership challenge in 1995 by Redwood, then the Secretary of State for Wales. Major survived, but Redwood received 89 votes from MPs, as well as the backing of the Sun newspaper, which described the choice as being between "Redwood or Deadwood". This further undermined Major's influence in the Conservative Party.

The Conservative government was also increasingly accused in the media of "sleaze". Their support reached its lowest ebb in late 1994, after the sudden death of Labour Party leader John Smith and the election of Tony Blair as his successor, when Labour had up to 60% of the vote in opinion polls and had a lead of some 30 points ahead of the Conservatives. The Labour lead was gradually narrowed over the next two years, as the Conservatives gained some credit for the strong economic recovery and fall in unemployment. But as the 1997 general election loomed, despite their high-profile New Labour, New Danger campaign, it was still looking certain that Labour would win.

An effective opposition campaign by the Labour Party culminated in a landslide defeat for the Conservatives in 1997 that was Labour's largest ever parliamentary victory and the worst defeat for the Conservatives since the 1906 general election 91 years earlier. The 1997 general election left the Conservative Party as an England-only party, with all Scottish and Welsh seats having been lost, and not a single new seat having been gained anywhere.

Political wilderness (1997–2005)

William Hague 
John Major resigned as party leader after the Conservatives were heavily defeated in a landslide and was succeeded by William Hague. Though Hague was a strong orator, a Gallup poll for The Daily Telegraph found that two-thirds of voters regarded him as "a bit of a wally", for headlines such as his claim that he drank 14 pints of beer in a single day in his youth. He was also criticised for attending the Notting Hill Carnival and for wearing a baseball cap in public in what were seen as poor attempts to appeal to younger voters. Shortly before the 2001 general election, Hague was much maligned for a speech in which he predicted that a re-elected Labour government would turn the UK into a "foreign land". The BBC also reported that the Conservative peer John Lord Taylor criticised Hague for not removing the whip from John Townend, a Conservative MP, after the latter made a speech in which he said the British were becoming "a mongrel race", although Hague did reject Townend's views.

The 2001 general election resulted in a net gain of just one seat for the Conservative Party, just months after the fuel protests of September 2000 had seen the Conservatives briefly take a narrow lead over Labour in the opinion polls.

Iain Duncan Smith and Michael Howard 
In 2001, Iain Duncan Smith was elected leader of the Conservative Party. Although Duncan Smith was a strong Eurosceptic, the issue did not define his leadership. During his tenure, Europe ceased to be an issue of division in the party as it united behind calls for a referendum on the proposed European Union Constitution.

However, before he could lead the party into a general election, Duncan Smith lost the vote on a motion of no confidence by MPs who felt that the party would not be returned to government under his leadership. This was despite the Conservative support equalling that of Labour in the months leading up to his departure from the leadership.

Michael Howard then stood for the leadership unopposed on 6 November 2003.

Under Howard's leadership in the 2005 general election, the Conservative Party increased their total vote share by around 0.7% (up to 32.4%) and—more significantly—their number of parliamentary seats by 33 (up to 198 seats). This gain accompanied a large decline in the Labour vote, and the election reduced Labour's majority from 167 to 68 and its share of the vote to 35.2%. The campaign, based on the slogan "Are you thinking what we're thinking?", was designed by Australian pollster Lynton Crosby. The day following the election, on 6 May, Howard announced that he did not feel it was right to continue as leader after defeat in the general election, also saying that he would be too old to lead the party into another campaign and would therefore step down after allowing time for the party to amend its leadership election rules.

David Cameron (2005–2016)

David Cameron won the 2005 leadership election. Cameron defeated his closest rival, David Davis, by a margin of more than two to one, taking 134,446 votes to 64,398. He then announced his intention to reform and realign the Conservatives, saying they needed to change the way they looked, felt, thought and behaved, advocating a more centre-right stance as opposed to their recent staunchly right-wing platform. Cameron's views were slightly to the left of the party membership and he sought to make the Conservative brand more attractive to young, socially liberal voters, he has also expressed his admiration for Margaret Thatcher, describing himself as a "big fan of Thatcher's", though he questions whether that makes him a "Thatcherite". For most of 2006 and the first half of 2007, polls showed leads over Labour for the Conservatives.

Polls became more volatile in summer 2007 with the accession of Gordon Brown as Prime Minister, although polls gave the Conservatives a lead after October of that year and, by May 2008, with the UK's economy sliding into its first recession since 1992. The Conservatives gained control of the London mayoralty for the first time in May 2008 after Boris Johnson defeated the Labour incumbent, Ken Livingstone.

The Conservative lead in the opinion polls had been almost unbroken for nearly three years when Britain finally went to the polls on 6 May 2010, though since the turn of 2010 most polls had shown the Conservative lead as less than 10 points wide. The election resulted in a hung parliament with the Conservatives having the most seats (306) but being twenty seats short of an overall majority. Following the resignation of Gordon Brown, Cameron was named the country's new Prime Minister, and the Conservatives entered government in a coalition with the Liberal Democrats—the first postwar coalition government.

In May 2014, the Conservatives were defeated in the European parliamentary elections, coming in third place behind the UK Independence Party and Labour. UKIP ended with 24 MEPs, Labour 20, and the Conservatives 19. The result was described by UKIP leader Nigel Farage as "disastrous" for Cameron, and the leaders of the other main parties.

In September 2014, the Unionist side, championed by Labour as well as by the Conservative Party and the Liberal Democrats, won in the Scottish Independence referendum by 55% No to 45% Yes on the question "Should Scotland be an independent country". This can be seen as a victory for British Unionism, a core part of traditional Conservative ideology, and also for Cameron as the incumbent Prime Minister.

At the 2015 general election, the Conservatives won a majority of seats in the House of Commons and formed a majority government under Cameron. The party increased its national vote share, becoming the first incumbent party to do so since 1900. The result was unexpected and exceeded even the party leadership's expectations, as most polls had predicted a hung parliament. This was also the first general election since 1992 in which the Conservatives had won an overall majority, although the vote share of 36.9% was lower than the previous four Conservative majority governments under Thatcher and Major. In March 2017, the party was fined £70,000, the largest fine of this sort in British political history, after an Electoral Commission investigation found "significant failures" by the party to report its 2015 general election campaign spending.

On the morning of Friday 24 June 2016, Cameron announced his intention to resign as Prime Minister, after he failed to convince the British public to stay in the European Union, and subsequently the Conservative Party leadership election was announced with Theresa May, Michael Gove, Stephen Crabb, Liam Fox and Andrea Leadsom confirmed as the official contenders to be his successor with Boris Johnson ruling himself out of the process. After Crabb withdrew, Fox and then Gove were eliminated in successive ballots by Conservative MPs, leaving Leadsom and May as the final candidates to be put before the wider Conservative Party membership. Leadsom subsequently withdrew from the contest on 11 July.

Theresa May (2016–2019)

On 11 July 2016, Theresa May became the leader of the Conservative Party with immediate effect following the withdrawal from the leadership election of her sole remaining opponent, Andrea Leadsom. Appointed Prime Minister of the United Kingdom on 13 July 2016, May promised social reform and a more centrist political outlook for the Conservative Party and its government. In a speech after her appointment, May emphasised the term Unionist in the name of the party, reminding all of "the precious, precious bond between England, Scotland, Wales and Northern Ireland". May considers herself a one nation conservative.

May's early cabinet appointments were interpreted both as "centrist and conciliatory", an effort to reunite the party in the wake of the UK's vote to leave the European Union, and as "a shift to the right" according to The Guardian.

May appointed former Mayor of London Boris Johnson as Foreign Secretary, former Secretary of State for Energy and Climate Change Amber Rudd as Home Secretary, and former Shadow Home Secretary David Davis to the newly created office of Brexit Secretary. Liam Fox and Philip Hammond, who had both previously served as Secretary of State for Defence (Fox from 2010 to 2011 and Hammond from 2011 to 2014), were appointed to the newly created office of International Trade Secretary and as Chancellor of the Exchequer respectively.
Replacing Michael Gove, Liz Truss was made Justice Secretary, the "first female Lord Chancellor in the thousand-year history of the role".
Andrea Leadsom, who was energy minister and May's primary competitor for party leader, was made the new environment secretary. However, former Northern Ireland Secretary Theresa Villiers resigned from Cabinet after May offered her a different, non-Cabinet post that was, she said, "not one which I felt I could take on". Nearly half of the first May ministry were women.

In her first speech, May made a promise to combat the "burning injustice" in British society and create a union "between all of our citizens" and promising to be an advocate for the "ordinary working-class family" and not just for "privileged few" in the UK.

In April 2017, the Cabinet agreed to hold a general election on 8 June. During the resulting campaign, Theresa May asked the electorate to "strengthen my hand" in Brexit negotiations, promised "strong and stable leadership in the national interest" and warned of a "coalition of chaos" under Jeremy Corbyn.

Contrary to opinion polling at the time, the election resulted in a hung parliament, with the Conservative Party having 317 seats in the House of Commons, but without an overall majority. The Democratic Unionist Party suggested it would be able to provide a confidence and supply arrangement depending on negotiations. On 9 June 2017, May announced her intention to form a new minority government with support from the DUP, which was finalised on 26 June.

On 8 January 2018, May announced her first major cabinet reshuffle, keeping in place most ministers, but promoting others.

In May 2018, the Conservative Party was accused of failing to take action on Islamophobia that was allegedly happening in the party.

In February 2019, three Conservative MPs – Heidi Allen, Sarah Wollaston, and Anna Soubry – defected from the party to join the Independent Group, a pro-EU political association of MPs founded by seven former members of the Labour Party. The MPs said the reasons for their departure were their opposition to the party's handling of Brexit, what they saw as the takeover of the Conservative party by 'right wing, ... hard-line anti-EU' MPs, and lack of concern from the Conservative party for the 'most vulnerable in society'.

May announced her resignation from the leadership of the Conservative Party on 24 May 2019, intending to leave the role on 7 June. However, she remained Prime Minister until a successor was elected by the party.

Theresa May resigned as Prime Minister on 24 July 2019 after her successor, Boris Johnson, was elected on 23 July 2019. She remained as the Member of Parliament for the Parliamentary Constituency of Maidenhead and won re-election for a further term as a backbencher in the December general election.

Boris Johnson (2019–2022)

In July 2019, former Foreign Secretary and Mayor of London Boris Johnson defeated Foreign Secretary Jeremy Hunt, with 66% of the vote in the final ballot of Conservative Party members, to become Leader of the Conservative Party. He became Prime Minister the next day.

Johnson lost his working majority in the House of Commons on 3 September 2019 when former Justice minister Phillip Lee crossed the floor during Johnson's speech to join the Liberal Democrats, later explaining that he believed the Conservative party had been "infected with the twin diseases of populism and English nationalism". The same day, the former Chancellor of the Exchequer Philip Hammond announced that he would "defend his party" against "incomers and entryists", perceived by some as referring to Johnson's adviser Dominic Cummings. Later that same day, 21 Conservative MPs had the Conservative whip withdrawn after voting with the Opposition to grant the House of Commons control over its order paper, leading to Johnson becoming the first Prime Minister to lose his first Commons vote.

Subsequent votes in the Commons effected the passing of the Benn Act, which Prime Minister Johnson controversially dubbed the 'Surrender Act'. The Act required the Prime Minister to request a formal extension to Article 50 if a new withdrawal agreement had not been approved by Parliament by 19 October 2019. After having agreed a revised withdrawal agreement (WA) with the European Union on 17 October, the Government put a motion before the House of Commons in a rare Saturday sitting on 19 October. This motion requested approval for the revised WA, such that the Benn Act would have been satisfied and no extension to Article 50 would be legally required. An amendment to the motion was passed, withholding formal approval of the WA until all the necessary legislation had been passed by Parliament. The following week, the full Withdrawal Agreement Bill (WAB) was introduced. It passed a second reading, but the programme motion for the bill put forward by the Government was voted down. This meant that there was no guarantee that the legislation would be passed in time to allow the United Kingdom to legally withdraw from the European Union (EU) on 31 October. Johnson had made withdrawal from the EU by this date "with no ifs, buts or maybes" a key pledge during his campaign for the leadership of the Conservative Party.

Johnson then immediately halted the WAB, and then called for a general election to be held. He made clear his view that Parliament was "...refusing to deliver Brexit. It's impossible to deliver legislation. It's time, frankly, the opposition summoned up the nerve to submit themselves to the judgment of our collective boss, which is the UK." After failing to gain the necessary support of two-thirds of all MPs to call an election under the provisions of the Fixed-term Parliaments Act, the Government indicated its intention to pass a short bill requiring only a simple majority of votes to hold such an election. The early parliamentary general election act was passed on 29 October 2019 and specified that a general election was to be held on 12 December 2019. This election resulted in Johnson's Conservatives winning of a majority of 80 seats in the House of Commons, a significant improvement on their 2017 result, and indeed the Party's largest majority since 1987, under Thatcher. The party won several constituencies, especially in Northern England but also in the Midlands and North Wales (often dubbed Labour's Red Wall), that the party had either never won before or had not produced a Tory majority in several decades. These results prompted observations from a number of political analysts in both the United Kingdom and abroad that the Conservatives under Johnson had widened their appeal to working class voters, particularly among those who had voted for Brexit. Having previously been split on the issue of British membership of the European Union since the premiership of John Major, the Conservatives adopted a clear pro-Brexit line under Johnson.

In late December 2019, a number of far-right activists claimed to have joined the Conservatives, prompting criticism by David Lammy over entryism.

On 20 December 2019, MPs passed an agreement for withdrawing from the EU, the United Kingdom formally left at 11pm on 31 January 2020. This began a transitional period, in which agreements between the UK and the EU would remain the same until 31 December 2020.

Johnson presided over the UK's response to the COVID-19 pandemic. Johnson initially held off on enacting lockdown measures, instead choosing to provide soft advice and protect vulnerable groups. With a rising death toll and hospital admission rate, Johnson later decided to enact a national lockdown on 23 March 2020. Johnson himself caught coronavirus during this period, and was moved to an intensive care unit on 7 April. Dominic Raab, who had been appointed First Secretary of State, deputised for Johnson whilst he was sick. Johnson later recovered from his illness, and returned to work on 27 April. Throughout May to July, COVID-19 restrictions began to ease in England.

Johnson received criticism in May 2020 for his handling of the Dominic Cummings scandal, in which Johnson's chief advisor Dominic Cummings was accused of breaking lockdown rules by travelling from London to County Durham whilst experiencing symptoms of COVID-19. Johnson defended Cummings' actions and refused to fire him.

With a significant increase in incidences of coronavirus during Winter 2020, Johnson enacted a system of tiered restrictions, in which areas across England would have varying levels of restrictions based on the number of cases in the area. The plan was criticised by some as ineffective, with some suggesting stricter lockdowns were being imposed on areas in northern England, increasing the north–south divide. Johnson again presided over a second strict lockdown, initially focusing on London and the south east on 20 December before increasing to the entire country two weeks later, due to the emergence of the Delta variant. The lockdown coincided with the approval and roll-out of the COVID-19 vaccine, with some praise for the speed of the roll-out. All legal restrictions were lifted in July 2021.

The Conservative Party took £11m from the finance sector between the 2019 general election and 2021 and became dependent on bankers and hedge fund tycoons, who gave nerly 40% of donations. Transparency campaigners feared Johnson was relying on "vested interests" who wanted little regulation and low business tax. Johnson gave the names of six major donors for peerages, including Michael Hintze who gave £4.5m to the Conservatives; Michael Spencer, who with his company gave roughly £7m; and Peter Cruddas, who gave £3.4m.  The Sunday Times found in 2021 15 of the previous 16 Conservative Party treasurers got peerages and each donated over £3m to the Conservatives.

From late 2021 onwards, Johnson received huge public backlash for the Partygate scandal, in which various senior members of government, aides, and Cabinet Office staff were pictured holding parties and other gatherings during lockdown. The Metropolitan Police investigated these claims and eventually fined Johnson for breaking lockdown rules in April 2022. Calls from leading opposition figures, including Labour Party leader Keir Starmer and the First Ministers of Scotland and Wales, for Johnson to resign as a consequence of Partygate were rejected. In July 2022, Johnson admitted to appointing Chris Pincher as deputy chief whip while being aware of allegations of sexual assault against him, and apologised. This, along with Partygate and increasing criticisms on Johnson's handling of the cost-of-living crisis, resulted in many members of the party losing confidence in Johnson as leader, and mass resignations from the Cabinet; this led to Johnson announcing his resignation as Conservative Party leader and Prime Minister on 7 July.

Liz Truss (2022) 

Following the July 2022 United Kingdom government crisis, Boris Johnson resigned as Prime Minister.

Boris Johnson's successor as leader of the party was confirmed as Liz Truss on 5 September, following a leadership election. She defeated Rishi Sunak, with 57.4% of the final ballot of party members. She became Prime Minister the following day.

The death of Queen Elizabeth II occurred just two days into Truss' premiership, making Truss the last Prime Minister to have been appointed by the Queen. Throughout the mourning period that followed, Truss met King Charles III and accompanied him on visits to various remembrance services across the country.

In a strategy labelled Trussonomics, Truss introduced policies in response to the cost of living crisis, including tax cuts, price caps on energy bills, and government help to pay them. However, her tax cuts were met with severe criticism as they benefitted higher earners much more, due to removing the top 45% rate of tax and offering tax cuts through the medium of cancelling a rise in national insurance. Markets reacted poorly to the actions of Truss and her Chancellor, Kwasi Kwarteng. After the announcement of the 'mini-budget' on 26 September, the pound fell to a record low of 1.03 against the dollar, and UK government gilt yields rose to 4.3%, prompting the Bank of England to trigger an emergency bond-buying programme. Condemnation was received from the public, the Labour Party, and from within the Conservative Party itself, and Truss scrapped some aspects of the budget, including axing the top rate of tax. In response to the criticism, Truss fired Kwarteng and appointed Jeremy Hunt as Chancellor. She also appeared in a number of interviews, including one with the BBC in which she apologised for the 'mistakes' she made in the first weeks of her premiership. After continuous backlash against her in Tory backbenches, Truss announced her pending resignation as Prime Minister on 20 October 2022, after just 44 days in office. This is the shortest term in British political history, breaking George Canning's previous record of 119 days after he died whilst in office.

Truss was observed as having not received a so-called 'honeymoon period' at the beginning of her term, wherein a leader experiences a polling boost upon taking office. Whereas former Labour prime minister Sir Tony Blair had an approval rating of up to around 90% during the early months of his premiership, polling suggested that Truss had an approval rating lower than any ever received by Boris Johnson or Jeremy Corbyn, including being mostly disapproved of by 2019 Conservative voters. Truss also oversaw the worst polling the Conservative Party has ever received - shortly after Truss' resignation the Labour Party's seven-day polling average stands at 54% up from 41% on 23 September, with the Conservatives' average falling from 33% to 21%. One poll, held between 26 and 30 September, suggested a loss of 219 Conservative seats, resulting in a Labour landslide.

Rishi Sunak (2022–present) 

Another leadership election began after Truss' resignation, with an increased nomination threshold of 100 and promises to conclude before 28 October, with Rishi Sunak and Penny Mordaunt declaring their candidacies. Boris Johnson was widely expected to attempt a comeback, but, while claiming he had the sufficient amount of support to enter the race, ruled himself out on 23 October. On 24 October, Mordaunt pulled out of the leadership race, and Sunak was declared Leader - with Sunak being the first Britsh Asian Leader of the Conservatives and the first British Asian Prime Minister.  YouGov found under Sunak the Conservatives poll below Labour and that voters feel they are less competent to handle various issues compared to Labour.  Under Sunak polls stabilised and the Labour lead reduced, but there is still a large gap.

Policies

Economic policy 
The Conservative Party believes that a free market and individual achievement are the primary factors behind economic prosperity.
A leading economic theory advocated by Conservatives is supply-side economics.  This theory holds that reduced income tax rates increase growth and enterprise (although a reduction in the budget deficit has sometimes taken priority over cutting taxes).  The party has recently focused on the social market economy in Britain, promoting a free market for competition with social balance to create fairness. This has included curbs on the banking sector, enterprise zones to revive regions in Britain and grand infrastructure projects such as high-speed rail.

One concrete economic policy of recent years has been opposition to the European single currency, the euro. With the growing Euroscepticism within his party, John Major negotiated a British opt-out in the 1992 Maastricht Treaty, which enabled the UK to stay within the European Union without adopting the single currency. However, several members of Major's cabinet, such as Kenneth Clarke, were personally supportive of EMU participation. Following Major's resignation after the 1997 election defeat, all subsequent Conservative leaders have positioned the party firmly against the adoption of the euro.

Following Labour's victory in the 1997 general election, the Conservative Party opposed Labour's decision to grant the Bank of England independent control of interest rates—on the grounds that it would be a prelude to the abolition of the pound sterling and acceptance of the European single currency, and also expressed concern over the removal of monetary policy from democratic control. However, Bank independence was popular amongst the financial community as it helped to keep inflation low. The Conservatives accepted Labour's policy in early 2000.

Since returning to power, the 50% top rate of income tax was reduced to 45% by the Cameron-Clegg coalition. Alongside a reduction in tax and commitments to keep taxation low, the Conservative Party has significantly reduced government spending, through the austerity programme which commenced in 2010. This program became increasing unpopular and as a result, during the 2019 election campaign, now incumbent Conservative Prime Minister Boris Johnson signalled an end to austerity with promises to restore 20,000 police officers from those previously cut and increase public investment in the NHS, amongst other anti-austerity promises.

Social policy 

Socially conservative policies such as tax incentives for married couples and the belief that benefits for those out of work should be reduced may have played a role in the party's electoral decline in the 1990s and early 2000s, and so the party has attempted to seek a new direction. The introduction of equal marriage rights for LGBT+ individuals in 2010 can be said to have represented a shift away from social conservatism, though the extent to which this policy truly represented a more 'liberal' Conservative party has been challenged.

Since 1997, debate has occurred within the party between 'modernisers' such as Alan Duncan, who believe that the Conservatives should modify their public stances on social issues, and 'traditionalists' such as Liam Fox and Owen Paterson, who believe that the party should remain faithful to its traditional conservative platform. William Hague and Michael Howard campaigned on traditionalist grounds in the 2001 and 2005 general elections respectively, and 2001 also saw the election of traditionalist Iain Duncan Smith as party leader. In the current parliament, modernising forces are represented by MPs such as Neil O'Brien, who has argued that the party needs to renew its policies and image, and is said to be inspired by Macron's centrist politics. Ruth Davidson is also seen as a reforming figure. Many of the original 'traditionalists' remain influential, though Duncan Smith's influence in terms of Commons contributions has waned. Many 'traditionalist' backbenchers such as Christopher Chope and Peter Bone command significant media attention for their use of filibustering and frequent interjections, and so remain influential forces in the Commons, though they cannot be taken to represent all 'traditionalist' Conservatives.

The party has strongly criticised Labour's "state multiculturalism". Shadow Home Secretary Dominic Grieve said in 2008 that state multiculturalism policies had created a "terrible" legacy of "cultural despair" and dislocation, which has encouraged support for "extremists" on both sides of the debate. David Cameron responded to Grieve's comments by agreeing that policies of "state multiculturalism" that treat social groups as distinct, for example policies that "treat British Muslims as Muslims, rather than as British citizens", are wrong. However, he expressed support for the premise of multiculturalism on the whole, arguing that it was "absolutely right" to encourage society to integrate more "to build a strong British identity for the future".

Official statistics showed that EU and non-EU mass immigration, together with asylum seeker applications, all increased substantially during Cameron's term in office. However, this was not solely as a result of intentional government policy – during this period, there were significant refugee flows into the UK and an increased level of asylum applications due to conflict and persecution in a number of other states. Some political and media discourses at the time suggested that this increase in immigration and reception of refugees and asylum seekers caused significant strain on other areas of social policy through overburdening the NHS and the welfare state – these discourses were influential, but have not been empirically or decisively proven to be true. In 2019, Conservative Home Secretary Priti Patel announced that the government would enact stricter immigration reforms by cracking down on illegal immigration and scrapping freedom of movement with the European Union following the completion of Brexit. These reforms also included introducing more stringent measures for migrating to the UK such as requiring that immigrants speak English, have skilled job offers, and meet minimum salary requirements, as well as persuading businesses to hire British workers over outsourcing to low-skilled immigrants.

Foreign policy 

For much of the 20th century, the Conservative Party took a broadly Atlanticist stance in relations with the United States, favouring close ties with the United States and similarly aligned nations such as Canada, Australia and Japan. The Conservatives have generally favoured a diverse range of international alliances, ranging from the North Atlantic Treaty Organization (NATO) to the Commonwealth of Nations.

Close US-British relations have been an element of Conservative foreign policy since World War II. Winston Churchill during his 1951–1955 post-war premiership built up a strong relationship with the Eisenhower Administration in the United States. Harold Macmillan demonstrated a similarly close relationship with the Democratic administration of John F. Kennedy. Though the US–British relationship in foreign affairs has often been termed a 'Special Relationship', a term coined by Winston Churchill, this has often been observed most clearly where leaders in each country are of a similar political stripe. Out of power and perceived as largely irrelevant by American politicians, Conservative leaders Hague, Duncan-Smith, and Howard each struggled to forge personal relationships with presidents Bill Clinton and George W. Bush. However, the Republican 2008 presidential candidate, John McCain, spoke at the 2006 Conservative Party Conference.

The Conservatives have proposed a Pan-African Free Trade Area, which it says could help entrepreneurial dynamism of African people. The Conservatives pledged to increase aid spending to 0.7% of national income by 2013. They met this pledge in 2014, when spending on aid reached 0.72% of GDP and the commitment was enshrined in UK law in 2015.

David Cameron had sought to distance himself from former US President Bush and his neoconservative foreign policy, calling for a "rebalancing" of US-UK ties and met Barack Obama during his 2008 European tour. Despite traditional links between the UK Conservatives and US Republicans, and between centre-left Labour and the Democrats, London Mayor Boris Johnson, a Conservative, endorsed Barack Obama in the 2008 election. However, after becoming Prime Minister, Boris Johnson developed a close relationship with Republican President Donald Trump, with both British and American media commentators drawing physical and ideological comparisons between the two leaders. This has also been described as a reestablishing of the Special Relationship with the United States following Britain's withdraw from the European Union, as well as returning to the links between the Conservatives and Republican Party.

Beyond relations with the United States, the Commonwealth and the EU, the Conservative Party has generally supported a pro free-trade foreign policy within the mainstream of international affairs. The degree to which Conservative Governments have supported interventionist or non-interventionist presidents in the US has often varied with the personal relations between the US president and the British prime minister.

Although stances have changed with successive leadership, the modern Conservative Party generally supports cooperation and maintaining friendly relations with the State of Israel. Historic Conservative statesmen such as Arthur Balfour and Winston Churchill supported the idea of national home for the Jewish people. Under Margaret Thatcher Conservative support for Israel was seen to crystallise. Support for Israel has increased under the leaderships of Theresa May and Boris Johnson, with prominent Conservative figures within the May and Johnson ministries such as Priti Patel, Robert Jenrick, Michael Gove and Sajid Javid strongly endorsing Israel. In 2016, Theresa May publicly rebutted statements made by US Secretary of State John Kerry over the composition of the Israeli government, which some commentators saw as a closer alignment to the stance of the incoming Trump administration. In 2018, the party pledged to proscribe all wings of the Lebanese-based militant group Hezbollah and this was adopted as a UK-wide policy in 2019. In 2019, the Conservative government under Boris Johnson announced plans to stop the influence of the Boycott, Divestment and Sanctions movement on local politics which included prohibiting local councils in the United Kingdom from boycotting Israeli products.

The Conservatives maintain a continuous stance of staying neutral on matters relating to Kashmir.

Defence policy

Afghanistan 
After the terrorist attacks of 11 September 2001, the Conservative Party supported the coalition military action in Afghanistan. The Conservative Party believed that success in Afghanistan would be defined in terms of the Afghans achieving the capability to maintain their own internal and external security. They have repeatedly criticised the former Labour Government for failing to equip British Forces adequately in the earlier days on the campaign—especially highlighting the shortage of helicopters for British Forces resulting from Gordon Brown's £1.4bn cut to the helicopter budget in 2004.

Strategic Defence and Security Review 

The Conservative Party believes that in the 21st century defence and security are interlinked. It has pledged to break away from holding a traditional Strategic Defence Review and have committed to carrying out a more comprehensive Strategic Defence and Security Review (SDSR) immediately upon coming into office. This review will include both defence and homeland security related matters. The Labour Government last conducted a review in 1998. To prevent a long gap in the future it also pledged to hold regular defence reviews every 4–5 years, and if necessary will put this requirement into legislation. Party officials claim that the SDSR will be a major improvement, and will ensure that Britain maintains generic and flexible capability to adapt to any changing threats. It will be a cross-departmental review that will begin with foreign policy priorities and will bring together all the levers of domestic national security policy with overseas interests and defence priorities.

As well as an SDSR, the Conservative Party pledged in 2010 to undertake a fundamental and far-reaching review of the procurement process and how defence equipment is provided in Britain. It pledged to reform the procurement process, compile a Green Paper on Sovereignty Capability, and publish another Defence Industrial Strategy following on from the Defence Industrial Strategy in 2005. The Conservative Party has said that there will be four aims for British defence procurement: to provide the best possible equipment at the best possible price; to streamline the procurement process to ensure the speedy delivery of equipment to the front line; to support our industry jobs at home by increasing defence exports; to provide defence procurement that underpins strategic relationships abroad and; to provide predictability to the defence industry.

The Conservative Party also pledged to increase Britain's share of the global defence market as Government policy.

NATO 

The Conservative Party upholds the view that NATO remains and should remain the most important security alliance for the United Kingdom.

It has advocated for the creation of a fairer funding mechanism for NATO's expeditionary operations and called for all NATO countries to meet their required defence spending 2% of GDP. As well as this, some Conservatives believe that there is scope for expanding NATO's Article V to include new 21st Century threats such as cybersecurity.

European defence 

The Conservative Party aims to build enhanced bilateral defence relations with key European partners and believes that it is in Britain's national interest to cooperate fully with all its European neighbours. It has pledged to ensure that any EU military capability must supplement and not supplant British national defence and NATO, and that it is not in the British interest to hand over security to any supranational body.

The Conservatives see it as a priority to encourage all members of the European Union to do more in terms of a commitment to European security at home and abroad.

Regarding the defence role of the European Union, the Conservatives pledged to re-examine some of Britain's EU Defence commitments to determine their practicality and utility; specifically, to reassess UK participation provisions like Permanent Structured Cooperation, the European Defence Agency and EU Battlegroups to determine if there is any value in Britain's participation.

Nuclear weapons 
The Conservatives support the UK's possession of nuclear weapons through the Trident nuclear missile programme.

Health policy 
In 1945, the Conservatives declared support for universal healthcare. Since entering office in 2010, they have introduced the Health and Social Care Act, constituting the biggest reformation that the NHS has ever undertaken. However, there has been much criticism and protest about the 2010 government's actions on the NHS, focusing on budget cuts and privatisation of services. After a 2013 union protest said by police to have been one of the largest protests seen in Manchester, the general secretary of the Trades Union Congress (TUC) said that austerity was having a devastating effect, with 21,000 NHS jobs lost over the previous three months alone, and that "The NHS is one of Britain's finest achievements and we will not allow ministers to destroy, through cuts and privatisation, what has taken generations to build." The Department of Health responded that there was "absolutely no government policy to privatise NHS services".

Drug policy 
The Conservative Party supports current drug prohibition policies. However, views on drugs do vary amongst some MPs in the party. Some Conservative politicians such as former MP Alan Duncan and Crispin Blunt take the libertarian approach that individual freedom and economic freedom of industry and trade should be respected. Other Conservative politicians, despite being economically liberal, are in favour of full prohibition of the ownership and trade of many drugs. Legalisation of cannabis for medical uses is favoured by some Conservative politicians. The party has rejected both decriminalising drugs for personal use and safe consumption rooms.

Education and research 
In education, the Conservatives have pledged to review the National Curriculum, and introduce the English Baccalaureate. The restoration of discipline was also highlighted, as they want it to be easier for pupils to be searched for contraband items, the granting of anonymity to teachers accused by pupils, and the banning of expelled pupils being returned to schools via appeal panels.

In Higher education, the Conservatives have increased tuition fees to £9,250 per year, however have ensured that this will not be paid by anyone until they are earning over £25,000. The Scottish Conservatives also support the re-introduction of tuition fees in Scotland. In 2016 the Conservative government extended student loan access in England to postgraduate students to help improve access to education.

Within the EU, the UK is one of the largest recipients of research funding in the European Union, receiving £7 billion between 2007 and 2015, which is invested in universities and research-intensive businesses. Following the vote to leave the EU, Prime Minister Theresa May guaranteed that the Conservative government would protect funding for existing research and development projects in the UK.

In autumn 2017 the Conservatives decided to introduce the T Level qualification aimed at improving the teaching and administration of technical education.

Family policy
As prime minister, David Cameron wanted to 'support family life in Britain' and put families at the centre of domestic social policymaking. He stated in 2014 that there was 'no better place to start' in the Conservative mission of 'building society from the bottom up' than the family, which was responsible for individual welfare and well-being long before the welfare state came into play. He also argued that 'family and politics are inextricably linked'. Both Cameron and Theresa May have aimed at helping families achieve a work-home balance and have previously proposed to offer all parents 12 months parental leave, to be shared by parents as they choose. This policy is now in place, offering 50 weeks total parental leave, of which 37 weeks are paid leave, which can be shared between both parents.

Other policies have included doubling the free hours of childcare for working parents of three and four-year-olds from 15 hours to 30 hours a week during term-time, although parents can reduce the number of hours per week to 22 and spread across 52 weeks of the year. However, numerous childcare providers have argued that this policy is unworkable, as it means that they do not receive enough compensation from the government to make up for the lost childcare fees, and so their businesses are no longer financially viable. The government also introduced a policy to fund 15 hours a week of free education and childcare for 2-year-olds in England if parents are receiving certain state benefits or the child has a SEN statement or diagnosis, worth £2,500 a year per child.

Jobs and welfare policy 
One of the Conservatives' key policy goals in 2010 was to reduce the number of people in the UK claiming state benefits, and increase the number of people in the workforce. Between 2010 and 2014, all claimants of Incapacity Benefit were moved onto a new benefit scheme, Employment and Support Allowance, which was then subsumed into the Universal Credit system alongside other welfare benefits in 2018. The Universal Credit system has come under immense scrutiny since its introduction. Shortly after her appointment to the Department for Work and Pensions, Secretary of State Amber Rudd acknowledged there were 'real problems' with the Universal Credit system, especially the wait times for initial payments and the housing payments aspect of the combined benefits. Rudd pledged specifically to review and address the uneven impact of Universal Credit implementation on economically disadvantaged women, which had been the subject of numerous reports by the Radio 4 You and Yours programme and others.

Until 1999, Conservatives opposed the creation of a national minimum wage, as they believed it would cost jobs, and businesses would be reluctant to start business in the UK from fear of high labour costs. However the party have since pledged support and in the July 2015 budget, Chancellor George Osborne announced a National Living Wage of £9/hour, to be introduced by 2020, for those aged 25 and over. The National Minimum Wage in 2012 was £6.19 for over-21-year olds, so the proposed rises in National Living Wage by 2020 will represent a significantly higher pay for many. However, the National Living Wage varies significantly by age, and there is evidence that up to 200,000 eligible individuals are not actually receiving the pay that they should be under the National Living Wage scheme. The party support, and have implemented, the restoration of the link between pensions and earnings, and seek to raise retirement age from 65 to 67 by 2028.

Energy and climate change policy 
David Cameron brought several 'green' issues to the forefront of his 2010 campaign. These included proposals designed to impose a tax on workplace car parking spaces, a halt to airport growth, a tax on cars with exceptionally poor petrol mileage, and restrictions on car advertising. Many of these policies were implemented in the Coalition—including the 'Green Deal'.

In November 2019, UK Prime Minister and Conservative Party leader Boris Johnson did not accept an invitation to a Channel 4 News climate debate on how to tackle the climate crisis that was attended by other political party leaders. Also in 2019, Greenpeace conducted a scorecard on the main parties' environmental commitments placing the party second from bottom (one point above the Brexit Party) and scoring it 7 out of 20. In 2021, Northern Conservative Party MPs declared their support for opening a new coal mine in Cumbria.  A poll in 2021 found that one in 15 Conservative MPs (7%) believe climate change is a myth. A poll of over 1,100 Conservative Party members in 2020 found that less than half believe that human activity is responsible for climate change and 9.7% did not believe that climate change was happening at all.

Justice, crime and security policy 
In 2010, the Conservatives campaigned to cut the perceived bureaucracy of the modern police force and pledged greater legal protection to people convicted of defending themselves against intruders.

The party has also campaigned for the creation of a UK Bill of Rights to replace the Human Rights Act 1998, but this was vetoed by their coalition partners the Liberal Democrats. Some Conservatives, particularly within the socially conservative Cornerstone Group, support the re-introduction of the death penalty.

The Conservatives' 2017 manifesto pledged to create a national infrastructure police force, subsuming the existing British Transport Police; Civil Nuclear Constabulary; and Ministry of Defence Police "to improve the protection of critical infrastructure such as nuclear sites, railways and the strategic road network". However, this has not yet occurred.

European Union policy 
No subject has proved more divisive in the Conservative Party in recent history than the role of the United Kingdom within the European Union. Though the principal architect of the UK's entry into the European Communities (which became the European Union) was Conservative Prime Minister Edward Heath, and both Winston Churchill and Harold Macmillan favoured some form of European union, the bulk of contemporary Conservative opinion is opposed to closer economic and particularly political union with the EU. This is a noticeable shift in British politics, as in the 1960s and 1970s the Conservatives were more pro-Europe than the Labour Party: for example, in the 1971 House of Commons vote on whether the UK should join the European Economic Community, only 39 of the then 330 Conservative MPs were opposed to membership.

The Conservative Party has members with varying opinions of the EU, with pro-European Conservatives joining the affiliate Conservative Group for Europe, while some Eurosceptics left the party to join the United Kingdom Independence Party. Whilst the vast majority of Conservatives in recent decades have been Eurosceptics, views among this group regarding the UK's relationship with the EU have been polarised between moderate, soft Eurosceptics who support continued British membership but oppose further harmonisation of regulations affecting business and accept participation in a multi-speed Europe, and a more radical, economically libertarian faction who oppose policy initiatives from Brussels, support the rolling back of integration measures from the Maastricht Treaty onwards, and have become increasingly supportive of a complete withdrawal.

In 2009 the Conservative Party actively campaigned against the Lisbon Treaty, which it believes would give away too much sovereignty to Brussels. Shadow Foreign Secretary William Hague stated that, should the treaty be in force by the time of an incoming Conservative government, he would "not let matters rest there". However, on 14 June 2009 the shadow Business Secretary, Kenneth Clarke, said in an interview to the BBC that the Conservative Party would not reopen negotiations on the Lisbon Treaty if the Irish backed it in a new referendum.

Constitutional policy 
Traditionally the Conservative Party has supported the uncodified constitution of the United Kingdom and its traditional Westminster system of politics. The party opposed many of Tony Blair's reforms, such as the removal of the hereditary peers, the incorporation of the European Convention on Human Rights into British law, and the 2009 creation of the Supreme Court of the United Kingdom, a function formerly carried out by the House of Lords.

There was also a split on whether to introduce a British Bill of Rights that would replace the Human Rights Act 1998; David Cameron expressed support, but party grandee Ken Clarke described it as "xenophobic and legal nonsense".

In 2019, the Conservatives' manifesto committed to a broad constitutional review in a line which read "after Brexit we also need to look at the broader aspects of our constitution: the relationship between the government, parliament and the courts". Following the party's significant election victory, it remains unclear what this may mean.

Organisation

Party structure 

The Conservative Party comprises the voluntary party, parliamentary party (sometimes called the political party) and the professional party.

Members of the public join the party by becoming part of a local constituency Conservative Association. The country is also divided into regions, with each region containing a number of areas, both having a similar structure to constituency associations. The National Conservative Convention sets the voluntary party's direction. It is composed of all association chairs, officers from areas and regions, and 42 representatives and the Conservative Women's Organisation. The Convention meets twice a year. Its Annual General Meeting is usually held at Spring Forum, with another meeting usually held at the Conservative Party Conference. In the organisation of the Conservative Party, constituency associations dominate selection of local candidates, and some associations have organised open parliamentary primaries.

The 1922 Committee consists of backbench MPs, meeting weekly while parliament is sitting. Frontbench MPs have an open invitation to attend. The 1922 Committee plays a crucial role in the selection of party leaders. All Conservative MPs are members of the 1922 Committee by default. There are 20 executive members of the committee, agreed by consensus among backbench MPs.

The Conservative Campaign Headquarters (CCHQ) is effectively head of the Professional Party and leads financing, organisation of elections and drafting of policy.

The Conservative Party Board is the party's ultimate decision-making body, responsible for all operational matters (including fundraising, membership and candidates) and is made up of representatives from each (voluntary, political and professional) section of the Party. The Party Board meets about once a month and works closely with CCHQ, elected representatives and the voluntary membership mainly through a number of management sub-committees (such as membership, candidates and conferences).

Membership 

Membership peaked in the mid-1950s at approximately 3 million, before declining steadily through the second half of the 20th century. Despite an initial boost shortly after David Cameron's election as leader in December 2005, membership resumed its decline in 2006 to a lower level than when he was elected. In 2010, the Conservative Party had about 177,000 members according to activist Tim Montgomerie, and in 2013 membership was estimated by the party itself at 134,000. The membership fee for the Conservative Party is £25, or £5 if the member is under the age of 23. From April 2013 until the 2015 general election people could join Team2015 without being Party members, and take part in political campaigning for the party. At the 2018 Conservative Spring Forum, Party chairman Brandon Lewis announced that the party's membership stood at 124,000.

In 2013 the Conservative Party lost an estimated 35–40% of its membership due to the Same Sex Marriage Bill.

Prospective parliamentary candidates 

Associations select their constituency's candidates. Some associations have organised open parliamentary primaries. A constituency Association must choose a candidate using the rules approved by, and (in England, Wales and Northern Ireland) from a list established by, the Committee on Candidates of the Board of the Conservative Party. Prospective candidates apply to the Conservative Central Office to be included on the approved list of candidates, some candidates will be given the option of applying for any seat they choose, while others may be restricted to certain constituencies. A Conservative MP can only be deselected at a special general meeting of the local Conservative association, which can only be organised if backed by a petition of more than fifty members.

Young Conservatives 

From 1998 to 2015, the Conservative Party maintained a youth wing for members under 30 called Conservative Future, with branches at both universities and at parliamentary constituency level. By 2006, the group had become the largest political organisation on British university campuses. The organisation was closed in 2015 after allegations that bullying by Mark Clarke had caused the suicide of Elliot Johnson, a 21-year-old party activist.

Conferences
The major annual party events are the Spring Forum and the Conservative Party Conference, which takes place in Autumn in alternately Manchester or Birmingham. This is when the National Conservative Convention holds meetings.

Funding 
In the first decade of the 21st century, half the party's funding came from a cluster of just fifty "donor groups", and a third of it from only fifteen. In the year after the 2010 general election, half the Tories' funding came from the financial sector.

For 2013, the Conservative Party had an income of £25.4 million, of which £749,000 came from membership subscriptions.

In 2015, according to accounts filed with the Electoral Commission, the party had an income of about £41.8 million and expenditures of about £41 million.

Construction businesses, including the Wates Group and JCB, have also been significant donors to the party, contributing £430,000 and £8.1m respectively between 2007 and 2017.

The Advisory Board of the party represents donors who have given significant sums to the party, typically in excess of £250,000.

In December 2022 The Guardian reported 10% of Conservative peers were large party donors and gave nearly £50m in total.  27 out of the party’s 274 peers had given over £100,000 to the Conservatives.  At least 6 large donor peers got government jobs in the 10 years to 2022.

International organisations 
The Conservative Party is a member of a number of international organisations, most notably the International Democrat Union which unites right-wing parties including the United States Republican Party, the Liberal Party of Australia, the Indian Bharatiya Janata Party, the Conservative Party of Canada and the South Korean United Future Party.

At a European level, the Conservatives are members of the European Conservatives and Reformists Party (ECR Party), which unites conservative parties in opposition to a federal European Union, through which the Conservatives have ties to the Ulster Unionist Party and the governing parties of Israel and Turkey, Likud and the Justice and Development Party respectively. In the European Parliament, the Conservative Party's MEPs sat in the European Conservatives and Reformists Group (ECR Group), which is affiliated to the ACRE.  Party leader David Cameron pushed the foundation of the ECR, which was launched in 2009, along with the Czech Civic Democratic Party and the Polish Law and Justice, before which the Conservative Party's MEPs sat in the European Democrats, which had become a subgroup of the European People's Party in the 1990s.  Since the 2014 European election, the ECR Group has been the third-largest group, with the largest members being the Conservatives (nineteen MEPs), Law and Justice (eighteen MEPs), the Liberal Conservative Reformers (five MEPs), and the Danish People's Party and New Flemish Alliance (four MEPs each). In June 2009, The Conservatives required a further four partners apart from the Polish and Czech supports to qualify for official fraction status in the parliament; the rules state that a European parliamentary caucus requires at least 25 MEPs from at least seven of the 27 EU member states. In forming the caucus, the party broke with two decades of co-operation by the UK's Conservative Party with the mainstream European Christian Democrats and conservatives in the European parliament, the European People's Party (EPP). It did so on the grounds that it is dominated by European federalists and supporters of the Lisbon treaty, which the Conservatives were generally highly critical of.

Logo 

When Sir Christopher Lawson was appointed as a marketing director at Conservative Central Office in 1981, he was surprised to find that, apart from a few diverse symbols, there was no logo to represent the party. He developed a design based on the Olympic flame in the colours of the Union Jack, which was intended to represent leadership, striving to win, dedication, and a sense of community. Despite opposition from some traditionalists in the party, the emblem was adopted for the 1983 general election. In 1989, the party's director of communications, Brendan Bruce, decided to conduct some market research into the public reaction to the logo. The results were that recognition of the symbol was low and that people found it old fashioned and uninspiring. It was decided to redesign the existing logo, rather than adopt an entirely new one which might be interpreted as signalling a change of the party's ethos. Using a design company headed by Michael Peters, an image of a hand carrying a torch was developed, which referenced the Statue of Liberty.

In 2006, there was a rebranding exercise to emphasise the Conservatives' commitment to environmentalism; a project costing £40,000 resulted in a sketched silhouette of an oak tree, a national symbol, which was said to represent "strength, endurance, renewal and growth". However, there was criticism from within the party; former chairman Norman Tebbit remarked on national radio that the new green logo resembled "a bunch of broccoli". It had been intended to unveil the emblem at the party conference, but a leak to the press resulted in it being launched a week earlier. A change from green to the traditional Conservative blue colour appeared in 2007, followed by a version with the Union Jack superimposed in 2010. An alternative version featuring the colours of the Rainbow flag was unveiled for an LGBT event at the 2009 conference in Manchester.

Party factions 
The Conservative Party has a variety of internal factions or ideologies, including one-nation conservatism, social conservatism, Thatcherism, traditional conservatism, neoconservatism, Euroscepticism, and Christian democracy.

Traditionalist Conservatives 
This socially conservative right-wing grouping is currently associated with the Cornerstone Group (or Faith, Flag and Family), and is the oldest tradition within the Conservative Party, closely associated with High Toryism. The name stems from its support for three social institutions: the Church of England, the unitary British state and the family. To this end, it emphasises the country's Anglican heritage, oppose any transfer of power away from the United Kingdom—either downwards to the nations and regions or upwards to the European Union—and seek to place greater emphasis on traditional family structures to repair what it sees as a broken society in the UK. It is a strong advocate of marriage and believes the Conservative Party should back the institution with tax breaks and have opposed the alleged assaults on both traditional family structures and fatherhood.

Most oppose high levels of immigration and support the lowering of the current 24‑week abortion limit. Some members in the past have expressed support for capital punishment. Prominent MPs from this wing of the party include Andrew Rosindell, Nadine Dorries, Edward Leigh and Jacob Rees-Mogg—the latter two being prominent Roman Catholics, notable in a faction marked out by its support for the established Church of England.

One-nation Conservatives 

One-nation conservatism was the party's dominant ideology in the 20th century until the rise of Thatcherism in the 1970s. It has included in its ranks Conservative Prime Ministers such as Stanley Baldwin, Harold Macmillan and Edward Heath. One-nation Conservatives in the contemporary party include former First Secretary of State Damian Green, the current chair of the One Nation Conservatives caucus.

The name itself comes from a famous phrase of Disraeli. Ideologically, One-nation conservatism identifies itself with a broad paternalistic conservative stance. One-nation Conservatives are often associated with the Tory Reform Group and the Bow Group. Adherents believe in social cohesion and support social institutions that maintain harmony between different interest groups, classes, and—more recently—different races or religions. These institutions have typically included the welfare state, the BBC, and local government.

One-nation Conservatives often invoke Edmund Burke and his emphasis on civil society ("little platoons") as the foundations of society, as well as his opposition to radical politics of all types. The Red Tory theory of Phillip Blond is a strand of the One-nation school of thought; prominent Red Tories include former Cabinet Ministers Iain Duncan Smith and Eric Pickles and Parliamentary Under-Secretary of State Jesse Norman. There is a difference of opinion among supporters regarding the European Union. Some support it perhaps stemming from an extension of the cohesion principle to the international level, though others are strongly against the EU (such as Peter Tapsell).

Free-market Conservatives 
The "free-market wing" of economic liberals achieved dominance after the election of Margaret Thatcher as party leader in 1975. Their goal was to reduce the role of the government in the economy and to this end, they supported cuts in direct taxation, the privatisation of nationalised industries and a reduction in the size and scope of the welfare state. Supporters of the "free-market wing" have been labelled as "Thatcherites". The group has disparate views of social policy: Thatcher herself was socially conservative and a practising Anglican but the free-market wing in the Conservative Party harbour a range of social opinions from the civil libertarian views of Michael Portillo, Daniel Hannan, and David Davis to the traditional conservatism of former party leaders William Hague and Iain Duncan Smith. The Thatcherite wing is also associated with the concept of a "classless society".

Whilst a number of party members are pro-European, some free-marketeers are Eurosceptic, perceiving most EU regulations as interference in the free market and/or a threat to British sovereignty. EU centralisation also conflicts with the localist ideals that have grown in prominence within the party in recent years. Rare Thatcherite Europhiles included Leon Brittan. Many take inspiration from Thatcher's Bruges speech in 1988, in which she declared that "we have not successfully rolled back the frontiers of the state in Britain only to see them reimposed at a European level". A number of free-market Conservatives have signed the Better Off Out pledge to leave the EU. Thatcherites and economic liberals in the party tend to support Atlanticism, something exhibited between Margaret Thatcher and Ronald Reagan.

Thatcher herself claimed philosophical inspiration from the works of Burke and Friedrich Hayek for her defence of liberal economics. Groups associated with this tradition include the No Turning Back Group and Conservative Way Forward, whilst Enoch Powell and Keith Joseph are usually cited as early influences in the movement. Some free-market supporters and Christian Democrats within the party tend to advocate the Social Market Economy, which supports free markets alongside social and environmental responsibility, as well a welfare state. Joseph was the first to introduce the model idea into British politics, writing the publication: Why Britain needs a Social Market Economy.

Relationships between the factions 
Sometimes two groupings have united to oppose the third. Both Thatcherite and Traditionalist Conservatives rebelled over Europe (and in particular Maastricht) during John Major's premiership; and Traditionalist and One Nation MPs united to inflict Margaret Thatcher's only major defeat in Parliament, over Sunday trading.

Not all Conservative MPs can be easily placed within one of the above groupings. For example, John Major was the ostensibly "Thatcherite" candidate during the 1990 leadership election, but he consistently promoted One-Nation Conservatives to the higher reaches of his cabinet during his time as Prime Minister. These included Kenneth Clarke as Chancellor of the Exchequer and Michael Heseltine as Deputy Prime Minister.

Electoral performance and campaigns
National campaigning within the Conservative Party is fundamentally managed by the CCHQ campaigning team, which is part of its central office
However, it also delegates local responsibility to Conservative associations in the area, usually to a team of Conservative activists and volunteers in that area, but campaigns are still deployed from and thus managed by CCHQ
National campaigning sometimes occurs in-house by volunteers and staff at CCHQ in Westminster.

The Voter Communications Department is line-managed by the Conservative Director of Communications who upholds overall responsibility, though she has many staff supporting her, and the whole of CCHQ at election time, her department being one of the most predominant at this time, including project managers, executive assistants, politicians, and volunteers. The Conservative Party also has regional call centres and VoteSource do-it-from-home accounts.

UK-wide elections

UK general elections
This chart shows the electoral performance of the Conservative Party in each general election since 1835.

For results of the Tories, the party's predecessor, see here.

Note

European Parliament elections

Note

Police and Crime Commissioner elections

Devolved elections

Scottish Parliament elections

Senedd elections

Northern Ireland devolved elections

Prior to 1973, the Ulster Unionist Party acted as the de facto Northern Ireland branch of the Conservative Party.  The UUP's results may be seen here.

London Mayoral elections

London Assembly elections

Combined authority elections

Associated groups

Ideological groups 

 Tory Reform Group
 Conservative Mainstream
 Bright Blue
 One Nation Conservatives
 Conservative Way Forward
 Cornerstone Group
 Selsdon Group
 The Monday Club

Interest groups 

 Conservative Animal Welfare Foundation
 Conservative Friends of Israel
 Conservative Friends of Turkey
 Conservative Friends of the Chinese

 LGBT+ Conservatives
 Bruges Group

 Conservative Christian Fellowship
 Conservative Muslim Forum

Think tanks 

 European Foundation

 Bow Group

 Centre for Policy Studies

Alliances 

 International Democrat Union
 European Democrat Union
 Economic League

 European Conservatives and Reformists
 European Democrat Group

 Alliance of European Conservatives and Reformists
 Ulster Conservatives and Unionists – New Force

Party structures 

 Scottish Conservatives
 Welsh Conservatives
 Northern Ireland Conservatives
 London Conservatives

 1922 Committee
 Conservative Campaign Headquarters (CCHQ)
 Conservative Party Archive
 Conservative Research Department

 Conservative Women's Organisation
 Young Conservatives
 Conservative Future Scotland

See also 

 History of the Conservative Party (UK)
 List of conservative parties by country
 List of Conservative Party MPs (UK)
 List of Conservative Party (UK) general election manifestos
 List of political parties in the United Kingdom
 Politics of the United Kingdom

Notes

References

Further reading 

 Bale, Tim. The Conservatives since 1945: the Drivers of Party Change. (2012, Oxford University Press )
 
 Ball, Stuart. Portrait of a Party: The Conservative Party in Britain 1918–1945 (Oxford UP, 2013).
 Beer, Samuel. "The Conservative Party of Great Britain," Journal of Politics 14#1 (February 1952), pp. 41–71 in JSTOR 
 
 Blake, Robert and Louis William Roger, eds. Churchill: A Major New Reassessment of His Life in Peace and War (Oxford UP, 1992), 581 pp; 29 essays by scholars on specialized topics
 Blake, Robert. The Conservative Party From Peel To Churchill (1970) online
 Bulmer-Thomas, Ivor. The Growth of the British Party System Volume I: 1640–1923 (1965); The Growth of the British Party System Volume II: 1924–1964, revised to 1966 Conservative-Labour Confrontation (1967)
 Campbell, John. Margaret Thatcher; Volume Two: The Iron Lady (Pimlico  (2003). 
 Charmley, John. "Tories and Conservatives." in David Brown, Robert Crowcroft, and Gordon Pentland eds., The Oxford Handbook of Modern British Political History, 1800–2000 (2018): 306.
 Dorey, Peter; Garnett, Mark; Denham, Andrew. From Crisis to Coalition: The Conservative Party, 1997–2010 (2011) Palgrave Macmillan.  excerpt and text search 
 . British conservatism: the politics and philosophy of inequality (IB Tauris, 2010), Covers more than just political party.
 Ensor,  R. C. K. England, 1870–1914  online , passim.
 
 Garnett, Mark, and Philip Lynch. The conservatives in crisis: the Tories after 1997 (1994)
 Green, E. H. H. Ideologies of conservatism: conservative political ideas in the twentieth century (2004)
 Green, E. H. H. The Crisis of Conservatism: The Politics, Economics and Ideology of the British Conservative Party, 1880–1914 (1995).
 . The Crisis of conservatism: The politics, economics, and ideology of the British Conservative Party, 1880–1914 (1996)
 Harris, Robert. The Conservatives – A History (2011) Bantam Press 
 Hayton, Richard, and Andrew Scott Crines, eds. Conservative orators from Baldwin to Cameron (2015).
 Hazell, Robert and Ben Yong, eds. The Politics of Coalition: How the Conservative-Liberal Democrat Government Works (Hart Publishing, 2012). 
 Heppell, Timothy, and David Seawright, eds. Cameron and the Conservatives: The Transition to Coalition Government (Palgrave Macmillan, 2012). 
 King, Anthony, ed. British Political Opinion 1937–2000: The Gallup Polls (2001)
 Lawrence, Jon. Electing Our Masters: The Hustings in British Politics from Hogarth to Blair (Oxford University Press, 2009) excerpt and text search 
 McKenzie, R. T., and A. Silver. Angels in Marble: Working-class Conservatives in Urban England (1968)
 Mowat, Charles Loch. Britain between the Wars, 1918–1940 (1955) 694 pp; 
 Norton, Bruce F. Politics in Britain (2007) textbook
 Parry, J. P. "Disraeli and England," Historical Journal 43#3 (2000), pp. 699–728 in JSTOR 
 
 Powell, David. British Politics, 1910–1935: The Crisis of the Party System (2004)
 Roberts, Andrew.  Churchill: Walking with Destiny (2018), a fully detailed biography.
 Reitan, Earl Aaron. The Thatcher Revolution: Margaret Thatcher, John Major, Tony Blair, and the Transformation of Modern Britain, 1979–2001  (2003) Rowman & Littlefield. 
 Searle, G. R. A New England?: Peace and War 1886–1918 (2005) 976pp broad survey
 Seldon, Anthony and Stuart Ball, eds. Conservative Century: The Conservative Party since 1900 (1994) 896pp; essays by experts Contents 
 Shannon, Richard. The Age of Disraeli, 1868–1881: The Rise of Tory Democracy (A History of the Conservative Party Series) (1992)
 Shannon, Richard. The Age of Salisbury, 1881–1902: Unionism and Empire (A History of the Conservative Party) (1996)
 Snowdon, Peter. Back from the Brink: The Extraordinary Fall and Rise of the Conservative Party (2010) HarperPress 
 Taylor, A. J. P. English History, 1914–1945 (1965), a standard political history of the era
 Thackeray, David. "Home and Politics: Women and Conservative Activism in Early Twentieth‐Century Britain," Journal of British Studies (2010) 49#4 pp. 826–48.
 Windscheffel, Alex. "Men or Measures? Conservative Party Politics, 1815–1951," Historical Journal Vol. 45, No. 4 (December 2002), pp. 937–51 in JSTOR

Historiography

 Crowson, N. J., ed. The Longman Companion to the Conservative Party Since 1830 (2001); chronologies; relations with women, minorities, trade unions, EU, Ireland, social reform and empire.
  Harrison, Brian. "Margaret Thatcher's Impact on Historical Writing", in William Roger Louis, ed., Irrepressible Adventures with Britannia: Personalities, Politics, and Culture in Britain (London, 2013), 307–21.
  Kowol, Kit. "Renaissance on the Right? New Directions in the History of the Post-War Conservative Party." Twentieth Century British History 27#2 (2016): 290–304. online 
 Porter, Bernard. "'Though Not an Historian Myself…'Margaret Thatcher and the Historians." Twentieth Century British History 5#2 (1994): 246–56.
 Turner, John. "The British Conservative Party in the Twentieth Century: from Beginning to End?." Contemporary European History 8#2 (1999): 275–87.

External links 

 
 Conservatives.tv
 Conservatives in Northern Ireland 
 Conservatives in Scotland
 Constitution of the Conservative Party
 conservative-party.net – Conservative website directory
 Guardian Politics – Special Report: Conservative Party
 The Thatcher legacy 1979–2009 – International conference
 

 
1834 establishments in the United Kingdom
Alliance of Conservatives and Reformists in Europe member parties
Conservative parties in the United Kingdom
Centre-right parties in the United Kingdom
European Conservatives and Reformists member parties
International Democrat Union member parties
Political parties established in 1834
Toryism
Politics of the United Kingdom articles needing expert attention